The Battle of Falmagne was a battle which occurred between the Holy Roman Empire and the United Belgian States on 22 September 1790.

A volunteer force of 5,000 Belgian revolutionaries with four cannons, led by General Koehler, crossed the river Maas at Moniat on 22 September 1790 to attack the heights of Anseremme and Falmagne. A second force of 2,000 troops crossed the Maas further south at Hastière in order to prevent the Austrian troops stationed at Blaimont reinforcing the attacked troops at Falmagne. The Belgian troops briefly captured the Anseremme heights and took possession of several enemy cannons. When Austrian cavalry troops reinforced the outpost and two of the Belgian powder carts exploded they were soon forced back over the Maas river. On the southern front the Belgian troops captured three cannons and took 30 enemy troops captive but soon fell into disarray and also retreated across the river. General Schönfeldt attacked the right-flank of the Austrians with a substantial numerical advantage but his attack was repelled.

Notes

References

Brabant Revolution
Falmagne
Falmagne
1790 in the Habsburg monarchy
1790 in the Holy Roman Empire
Dinant